Raluana Rural LLG is a local-level government (LLG) of East New Britain Province, Papua New Guinea.

Wards
01. Raburua
02. Bitatita
03. Nugvalian
04. Raluana
05. Barovon
06. Ialakua
07. Vunatagia
08. Ranguina
09. Bitabaur
10. Vunamurmur
12. Vunaulul
13. Ralalar
14. Turagunan
15. Kunakunai
16. Ngatur
17. Tinganalom
18. Nanuk
19. Balanataman
20. Ravat
21. Talakua

References

Local-level governments of East New Britain Province